Unknown Soldier may refer to:

Places 
 Tomb of the Unknown Soldier, a type of memorial site in many nations
 The British grave of The Unknown Warrior in Westminster Abbey

Literature 
The Unknown Soldier (novel), a 1954 novel by Väinö Linna
"Unknown Soldier" (short story), a short story by Kurt Vonnegut

Film 
 The Unknown Soldier (1926 film)
 The Unknown Soldier (1955 film), a Finnish film based on the novel by Väinö Linna
 Unknown Soldier (1968 film), a film by Donald Shebib
 The Unknown Soldier (1985 film), a Finnish film based on the novel by Väinö Linna
 The Unknown Soldier (1998 miniseries), a British miniseries featuring Aislín McGuckin
 The Unknown Soldier (2006 film), a German documentary film by Michael Verhoeven about the 
 The Unknown Soldier (2017 film), a Finnish film based on the novel by Väinö Linna

Music 
Unknown Soldier (Fela Kuti album), 1979
The Unknown Soldier (album), a 1980 album by Roy Harper, or its title song
Unknown Soldier (Warmen album), 2000, or its title song
The Unknown Soldier (song), a 1968 song by the Doors
"Unknown Soldier", a song by Breaking Benjamin, and is the fourth single from the album Phobia
"Unknown Soldier", a song by the Casualties from On the Front Line
"Unknown Soldiers", an anthem of Lehi

Comics 
Unknown Soldier (Ace Comics), a superhero character
Unknown Soldier (DC Comics), the name of several distinct characters

Other uses
"Unknown Soldier" (The Unit), an episode of The Unit
William Eckert or Unknown Soldier, Major League Baseball commissioner 
The Unknown Soldiers, protagonists of Forgotten Worlds

See also 
 Unknown Rebel
 The Unknown Warrior, in Westminster Abbey